The women's 800 metres event at the 1967 Summer Universiade was held at the National Olympic Stadium in Tokyo on 3 and 4 September 1967.

Medalists

Results

Heats

Final

References

Athletics at the 1967 Summer Universiade
1967